Phoneyusa lesserti is a species of spiders belonging to the family Theraphosidae (tarantulas).

Distribution
This species can be found in the Central African Republic.

References

Endemic fauna of the Central African Republic
Theraphosidae
Spiders of Africa
Spiders described in 1973